Walter Everett may refer to:

Walter Goodnow Everett (1860–1937), professor of Latin, philosophy, and natural theology
Walter Everett (musicologist), musicologist specializing in popular music
Walter Hunt Everett, American artist
Walter Everett (journalist), journalist, awarded special citation for Maria Moors Cabot prize in 1975